His Best is a 1997 greatest hits compilation album by Sonny Boy Williamson II (real name Rice Miller) released by Chess and MCA Records in May as a part of The Chess 50th Anniversary Collection which released many albums titled His Best for artist such as Bo Diddley, Little Walter, and others.

Songs
The album features all three of Williamson's singles that charted on Billboard's R&B Singles chart; "Don't Start Me Talking" (#3), "Keep It to Yourself" (#14), and "Help Me" (#24). The album also features "Bring It On Home" (later covered by Led Zeppelin) and "One Way Out" (covered by Allman Brothers Band).

Track listing
All tracks written by Sonny Boy Williamson II, except where noted.
"Good Evening Everybody" – 2:36
"Don't Start Me Talking" – 2:36
"All My Love in Vain" – 2:51
"Keep It to Yourself" – 2:50
"Fattening Frogs for Snakes" – 2:23
"I Don't Know" – 2:28
"Cross My Heart" (Williamson, Greg Guidry) – 3:24
"Born Blind" – 2:35
"Ninety Nine" – 2:40
"Your Funeral and My Trial" – 2:33
"Keep Your Hands Out of My Pockets" – 2:51
"Sad to Be Alone" – 2:59
"Checkin' Up on My Baby" – 1:59
"Down Child" – 2:37
"Nine Below Zero" – 3:30
"Bye Bye Bird" (Williamson, Willie Dixon) – 2:35
"Help Me" (Williamson, Dixon, Ralph Bass) – 3:11
"Bring It On Home" (Dixon) – 2:39
"My Younger Days" – 3:24
"One Way Out" (Williamson, Elmore James) – 2:46

Personnel
All personnel per Allmusic
Performers
Sonny Boy Williamson II – lead vocals, harmonica
Buddy Guy – guitar
Robert Lockwood, Jr. – guitar
Matt "Guitar" Murphy – guitar
Eugene Pierson – guitar
Jimmy Rogers – guitar
Luther Tucker – guitar
Muddy Waters – guitar
Willie Dixon – double bass
Jack Meyers – bass
Milton Rector – bass
Lafayette Leake – piano
Otis Spann – piano
Fred Below – drums
Al Duncan – drums
Clifton James – drums
Jarrett Gibson – saxophone
Donald Hankins – saxophone

Production
Leonard Chess – producer, engineer
Phil Chess – producer, engineer
Willie Dixon – producer, engineer
Andy McKaie – producer, compiler
Dick Shurman – liner notes, compiler
Erick Labson – remastering
Bill Inglot – remixing
John Strother – remixing

Artwork/Design
Vartan – art director
Geary Chansley – photo research
Meire Murakami – design
Val Wilmer – photography
Galen Gart – photography

References

Sonny Boy Williamson II albums
1997 compilation albums
albums produced by Leonard Chess
albums produced by Phil Chess
albums produced by Willie Dixon
MCA Records compilation albums
Chess Records compilation albums